Walter Daniel John Tull (28 April 1888 – 25 March 1918) was an English professional footballer and British Army officer of Afro-Caribbean descent. He played as an inside forward and half back for Clapton, Tottenham Hotspur and Northampton Town and was the third person of mixed heritage to play in the top division of the Football League after Arthur Wharton and Willie Clarke. He was also the first player of African descent to be signed for Rangers in 1917 while stationed in Scotland.

During the First World War, Tull served in the Middlesex Regiment, including in the two Footballers' Battalions. He was commissioned as a second lieutenant on 30 May 1917 and killed in action on 25 March 1918.

Early life
Tull was born in Folkestone, Kent, the son of Barbadian carpenter Daniel Tull and Kent-born Alice Elizabeth Palmer. His paternal grandfather was a slave in Barbados. His maternal English grandmother was from Kent. He began his education at North Board School, now Mundella Primary School, Folkestone.

In 1895, when Tull was seven, his mother died of cancer. A year later his father married Alice's cousin, Clara Palmer. She gave birth to a daughter Miriam, on 11 September 1897. Three months later, Daniel died from heart disease. The stepmother was unable to cope with five children so the resident minister of Folkestone's Grace Hill Wesleyan Chapel, recommended that the two boys of school age, Walter and Edward, should be sent to an orphanage. From the age of 9, Tull was brought up in the (Methodist) Children's Home and Orphanage (now known as Action for Children) in Bethnal Green, London. Edward was adopted by the Warnock family of Glasgow, becoming Edward Tull-Warnock; he qualified as a dentist, the first mixed-heritage person to practise this profession in the United Kingdom.

Career
His professional football career began after he was spotted playing for top amateur club, Clapton. He had signed for Clapton in October 1908, reportedly never playing in a losing side. By the end of the season he had won winners' medals in the FA Amateur Cup, London County Amateur Cup and London Senior Cup. In March 1909 the Football Star called him "the catch of the season". At Clapton, he played alongside Clyde Purnell and Charlie Rance.

At the age of 21, Tull signed for Football League First Division team, Tottenham Hotspur, in the summer of 1909, after a close-season tour of Argentina and Uruguay, making him the first mixed-heritage professional footballer to play in Latin America. Tull made his debut for Tottenham in September 1909 at inside forward against Sunderland and his home Football League debut against FA Cup-holders, Manchester United, in front of over 30,000. His excellent form in this opening part of the season promised a great future. Tull made only 10 first-team appearances, scoring twice, before he was dropped to the reserves. This may have been due to the racial abuse he received from opposing fans, particularly at Bristol City, whose supporters used language "lower than Billingsgate", according to a report at the time in the Football Star newspaper. The match report of the game away to Bristol City in October 1909 by Football Star reporter, "DD", was headlined "Football and the Colour Prejudice", possibly the first time racial abuse was headlined in a football report. "DD" emphasised how Tull remained professional and composed despite the intense provocation; "He is Hotspur's most brainy forward ... so clean in mind and method as to be a model for all white men who play football ... Tull was the best forward on the field." However, soon after, Tull was dropped from the first team and found it difficult to get a sustained run back in the side.

Further appearances in the first team (20 in total with four goals) were recorded before Tull's contract was bought by Southern Football League club Northampton Town on 17 October 1911 for a "substantial fee" plus Charlie Brittain joining Tottenham Hotspur in return. Tull made his debut four days later against Watford, and made 111 first-team appearances (105 in the League), scoring nine goals for the club. The day before the Titanic sank on April 15, 1912, Tull scored four goals in a match against Bristol Rovers. The manager Herbert Chapman, also a Methodist, was a former Spurs player and had played as a young man with Arthur Wharton at Stalybridge Rovers; he went on to manage both Huddersfield Town and Arsenal to FA Cup wins and League championships.

In 1940, it was reported in an article in the Glasgow Evening Times about Tull being the first "coloured" infantry officer in the British Army, that he had signed to play for Rangers after the war. Rangers have confirmed that Tull signed for them in February 1917, while an officer cadet in Scotland at Gailes, Ayrshire.

First World War

After the First World War broke out in August 1914, Tull became the first Northampton Town player to enlist in the British Army, in December of that year. Tull served in the two Football Battalions of the Duke of Cambridge's Own (Middlesex) Regiment, the 17th and 23rd, and also in the 5th Battalion. He rose to the rank of lance sergeant and fought in the Battle of the Somme in 1916.

When Tull was commissioned as a second lieutenant on 30 May 1917, he became one of the first mixed-heritage infantry officers in a regular British Army regiment, when the 1914 Manual of Military Law excluded soldiers that were not "natural born or naturalised British subjects of pure European descent" from becoming commissioned officers in the Special Reserve.

With the 23rd Battalion, Tull fought on the Italian Front from 30 November 1917 to early March 1918. He was praised for his "gallantry and coolness" by Major-General Sydney Lawford, General Officer Commanding 41st Division, having led 26 men on a night-raiding party, crossing the fast-flowing rapids of the Piave River into enemy territory and returning them unharmed.

Tull and the 23rd Battalion returned to northern France on 8 March 1918. He was killed in action near the village of Favreuil in the Pas-de-Calais on 25 March during the First Battle of Bapaume, the early stages of the German Army's Spring Offensive. His body was never recovered, despite the efforts of, among others, Private Tom Billingham, a former goalkeeper for Leicester Fosse to return him to the British position while under fire.

In a letter of condolence to his family, the commanding officer of the 23rd Battalion, Major Poole and his colleague 2Lt Pickard both said that Tull had been put forward for a Military Cross. Pickard wrote "he had been recommended for the Military Cross, and certainly earned it." However, the Ministry of Defence has no record of any recommendation but many records were lost in a 1940 fire.

Legacy
In the history of mixed-heritage footballers in Britain, Tull may be mentioned alongside Robert Walker of Third Lanark, Andrew Watson, an amateur who is credited as the earliest black international football player winning his first cap for Scotland in 1881, Arthur Wharton, a goalkeeper for several clubs including Darlington and became the first mixed-heritage professional in 1889, John Walker of Hearts and Lincoln who died aged 22, the Anglo-Indian Cother brothers, Edwin and John, who began their careers at Watford in 1898 and Willie Clarke who played for Aston Villa and Bradford City in the Edwardian era.

From around 2006, campaigners including the then Northampton South MP, Brian Binley, and Phil Vasili, who has researched Tull since the early 1990s, called for a statue to be erected in his honour at Dover and for him to be posthumously awarded the Military Cross. However, as the Military Cross was not authorised to be awarded posthumously until 1979, and the change did not include any provision for retrospective awards, this would not be possible without a change in the rules. The campaigners felt this would be justified given that the army broke the rules. Tull's commission, at a time when the army was desperately short of officers was also due to his natural leadership, coolness and respect of his unit's officers and men. If he had been recommended for a Military Cross, his status as an officer of non-European descent might have meant to award him the honour would validate his status, leading to more mixed-heritage officers being commissioned. A Royal Army Medical Corps officer Allan Noel Minns, also a natural-born British subject of Afro-Caribbean descent, was awarded both DSO and MC.

Memorials

Tull is commemorated on Bay 7 of the Arras Memorial, which commemorates 34,785 soldiers who have no known grave, who died in the Arras sector.

His name was added to his parents' gravestone in Cheriton Road Cemetery, Folkestone. His older brother William, of the Royal Engineers, died in 1920, aged 37, and is buried in the cemetery with a CWGC headstone so his death was recognised as a result of his war service.

His name is listed in the Roll of Honour for the City of Glasgow, his address given as 419 St Vincent Street, the location of the dental surgery belonging to his brother Edward.

Tull's name appeared on the war memorial at North Board School, Folkestone, unveiled on 29 April 1921. He is named on the Folkestone War Memorial, at the top of the Road of Remembrance in Folkestone, and in Dover his name is on the town war memorial outside Maison Dieu House, and on the parish memorial at River.

On 11 July 1999, Northampton Town F.C. unveiled a memorial wall to Tull in a garden of remembrance at Sixfields Stadium. The text, written by Tull's biographer, Phil Vasili, reads:

Through his actions, W. D. J. Tull ridiculed the barriers of ignorance that tried to deny people of colour equality with their contemporaries. His life stands testament to a determination to confront those people and those obstacles that sought to diminish him and the world in which he lived. It reveals a man, though rendered breathless in his prime, whose strong heart still beats loudly. A road behind the North Stand (The Dave Bowen Stand) at Sixfields Stadium is named Walter Tull Way, and a public house, adjacent to the stadium, bears his name.

On 28 July 2004, Tottenham Hotspur and Rangers contested the "Walter Tull Memorial Cup". Rangers won the Cup, defeating Spurs 2–0 with goals from Dado Pršo and Nacho Novo.

In 2010, a planning application to erect a bronze memorial statue of Tull in Geraldine Mary Harmsworth Park close to the Imperial War Museum in London, was refused by Southwark London Borough Council.

The Royal Mint included a £5 coin honouring Tull in the introductory First World War six-coin set, released in 2014.

On 21 October 2014, a blue plaque was unveiled at 77 Northumberland Park, London N17, on the site of the house where Tull lived before the war, close to the White Hart Lane ground. The plaque was provided by the Nubian Jak Community Trust and was unveiled by former Spurs striker Garth Crooks who described Tull as an "amazing man," whose recognition had been "a long time coming".

On 4 July 2017, five statues including one of Tull were unveiled in the courtyard of Northampton Guildhall. The bronze installations were commissioned by Northampton Borough Council from sculptor Richard Austin.

On 25 March 2018, to commemorate the centenary of his death, Rushden & District History Society unveiled a blue plaque at 26 Queen Street, Rushden where he lodged while playing at Northampton Town.

In September 2018, to mark the centenary of the end of the First World War, Royal Mail produced a set of stamps, one of which features Tull.

On Remembrance Sunday 2018, the people of Ayr, Scotland, came together to etch a large sand portrait of Tull into the town's beach as part of 'Pages of the Sea', a nationwide public art project curated by Oscar-winning filmmaker Danny Boyle.

In October 2020, as part of Black History Month, the Royal Mail painted a postbox black in Glasgow to honour Tull.

On 21 October 2021, Tull was inducted into the English Football Hall of Fame of the National Football Museum.

On 23 July 2022, Tottenham Hotspur and Rangers contested their second "Walter Tull Memorial Cup". Tottenham winning the game 2-1 at Ibrox.

Media
Respect!, an account of Tull's life, written for young people by Michaela Morgan, was published by Barrington Stoke in 2005. The book was shortlisted in the Birmingham Libraries young readers' book festival May 2008.

A fictional work, Fields of Glory: The Diary of Walter Tull, by Maureen Lewis, Jillian Powell and Bernice Barry, was published by Longman in 2005. (Please note: this is a work of fiction; there is no surviving diary written by Tull.)

Two films, focusing on teaching about Tull, were made for Teachers TV and launched in May 2008.

Walter's War, a drama about the life of Tull, starring O. T. Fagbenle and written by Kwame Kwei-Armah, was made by UK channel BBC Four and first screened on 9 November 2008 as part of the BBC's Ninety Years of Remembrance season. The drama was aired alongside Forgotten Hero, a documentary about Tull.

A biography by Phil Vasili, titled Walter Tull, 1888–1918, Officer, Footballer was published by Raw Press, 2010. A revised edition was published in 2018 by London League Publications.

A book for young readers, Walter Tull: Footballer, Soldier, Hero, written by Dan Lyndon, was published by Collins Educational in January 2011.

A Medal for Leroy (2012) by Michael Morpurgo is inspired by the life of Tull.

The Octagon Theatre, Bolton staged Vasili's play Tull, 21 February to 16 March 2013. Working with local young people, Tottenham Theatre Group produced a version at the Bernie Grant Centre in Tottenham in 2014.

In 2014, Gazebo Theatre, based in Bilston Town Hall, toured a play about the life of Tull, entitled The Hallowed Turf. It was presented in Wolverhampton on 3 October to launch the city's Black History Month.

In 2016, Off The Records made an animated film about Tull's life, Walter Tull: Britain's First Black Officer, which was voiced by actor Liam Gerrard. The film was nominated for a children's BAFTA.

Notes

References

Further reading
 Baker, Chris. "Walter Daniel Tull and recommendation for the Military Cross" The Long, Long Trail, 21 June 2018. Retrieved 9 April 2019.

 Kuper, Simon. "Political Football: Walter Tull", Channel 4 News, 4 September 2007. Retrieved 9 April 2019.
 McMullen, Iain. "Walter Tull", Football and the First World War.Retrieved 9 April 2019.
  Simkin, John. "Walter Tull", Spartacus Educational.Retrieved 9 April 2019.
 Stephenson-Knight, Marilyn. "First Black Army Officer, Footballer, and Great War Hero", The Dover War Memorial Project. Retrieved 9 April 2019.
 Turner, Lyndsey. "The lesson: Walter Tull", The Guardian, 25 March 1998. Retrieved 9 April 2019.
 
 Teaching material about Walter Tull, produced for Northamptonshire Black History Association, www.blackhistory4schools.com. Retrieved 9 April 2019.
 "The extraordinary life of Walter Tull", BBC London, 13 November 2014. Retrieved 9 April 2019.

External links
 WalterTull.org
 
For records relating to Tull in The National Archives, see Your Archives
Tull's application for a temporary commission at The National Archives

1888 births
1918 deaths
Association football midfielders
Black British sportsmen
British Army personnel of World War I
British military personnel killed in World War I
Clapton F.C. players
English Football League players
English footballers
English sportspeople of Barbadian descent
Footballers from Bethnal Green
Italian front (World War I)
Middlesex Regiment officers
Middlesex Regiment soldiers
Northampton Town F.C. players
People from Folkestone
People from Northamptonshire
Tottenham Hotspur F.C. players
Military personnel from Kent